The Toutunhe Formation is a Late Jurassic geological formation in China, specifically dating to the Oxfordian and Kimmeridgian stages. Dinosaur remains diagnostic to the genus level are among the fossils that have been recovered from the formation. The lower portion of the formation consists of grey to reddish mudstone with medium to coarse grained cross bedded sandstone, while the upper portion consists primarily of brown-red-purple mudstone, interbedded with fine to medium grained laminated sandstone.

Paleofauna
Tianchisaurus nedegoapeferima - "Partial skeleton."

See also

 List of dinosaur-bearing rock formations
 List of stratigraphic units with few dinosaur genera

Footnotes

References
 Weishampel, David B.; Dodson, Peter; and Osmólska, Halszka (eds.): The Dinosauria, 2nd, Berkeley: University of California Press. 861 pp. .

Jurassic China
Jurassic System of Asia
Geologic formations of China